Łutselkʼe ("place of the ", the cisco, a type of small fish), also spelt Łutsël Kʼé, is a "designated authority" in the North Slave Region of the Northwest Territories, Canada. The community is located on the south shore near the eastern end of Great Slave Lake and until 1 July 1992, it was known as Snowdrift, as the community lies near the mouth of the Snowdrift River.

History
Łutselkʼe is a First Nation community and the area was traditionally occupied by the Chipewyan Dene In 1925 the Hudson's Bay Company opened a post followed by the Roman Catholic Church. A school opened in 1960.

Demographics

In the 2016 Census the majority of the population, 270 people, were First Nations, 10 people were Métis and 10 were Inuit. The main languages in the community are Denesuline and English.

In 2016, 115 people said they spoke an Indigenous languages as their mother tongue. Of these 115 people, 105 spoke Dene (Chipewyan or Denesuline), 5 spoke Dogrib or Tłı̨chǫ and 5 spoke North Slavey or Hare. Another 5 people gave a Chinese language as their mother tongue. A total of 295 knew English and another 5 knew both English and French.

Services
There is a two-person Royal Canadian Mounted Police detachment and health centre with two nurses in the community. There is a single grocery store, the Lutselk'e Co-op, a post office and nine lodges / outfitters in the area. Education in the community is provided by the Lutsel Kʼe Dene School, which offers a comprehensive K-12 program. Additionally, there is also a community learning centre run by Aurora College.

Although not accessible by road there is an airport, Lutselk'e Airport, with scheduled services from Yellowknife and an annual sealift is provided by the territorial government's ships from Hay River in the summer. Lutselk'e Water Aerodrome is available in the summer months when the lake is clear of ice.

First Nations
Łutsel Kʼe is represented by the Łutsël K'é Dene First Nation and are part of the Akaitcho Territory Government.

References

Further reading

 Barnes, F.Q. Snowdrift Map-Area, District of Mackenzie, Northwest Territories (Preliminary Report). Geological Survey of Canada paper, 51–6. Ottawa, Ont: GSC, 1951.
 Bielawski, E. The Desecration of Nánúlá Kúé Impact of Taltson Hydroelectric Development on Dene Sonline. [s.l.]: Łutsel Kʼe Dene First Nation, 1993.
 Canada, and M. M. Dillom Limited. Final Report Environmental Assessment Studies, Northern Canada Power Commission Facilities at Snowdrift, Repulse Bay and Grise Fiord, Northwest Territories. Edmonton, Alta: Environment Canada, 1978.
 Chambers, Cynthia Maude. Damaged and Needing Help Violence and Abuse in Aboriginal Families in Yellowknife and Lutsel Kʼe. [S.l.]: Lutra Associates, 1993.
 Northwest Territories, and BHP Billiton Diamonds Inc. Communities and Diamonds Socio-Economic Impacts in the Communities of: Behchoko, Gameti, Whati, Wekweeti, Detah, Ndilo, Lutsel Kʼe, and Yellowknife : 2005 Annual Report of the Government of the Northwest Territories Under the BHP Billiton, Diavik and De Beers Socio-Economic Agreements. [Yellowknife]: Govt. of the Northwest Territories, 2006.
 Parlee, Brenda, Evelyn Marlowe, Lutsel Kʼe Dene First Nation. Traditional Knowledge on Community Health Community-Based Monitoring. Yellowknife: West Kitikmeot/Slave Study Society, 1998.
 Shinpo, Mitsuru, and Cyntha Struthers. A Preliminary Report Prepared for the Snowdrift Indian Band. Waterloo, Ont: St. Jerome's College, University of Waterloo, 1990.
 Weitzner, Viviane. Dealing Full Force Lutsel Kʼe Dene First Nation's Experience Negotiating with Mining Companies. Ottawa, Ont: North-South Institute, 2006.

External links

Communities in the North Slave Region
Dene communities
Road-inaccessible communities of the Northwest Territories